The list of shipwrecks in June 1822 includes some ships sunk, foundered, grounded, or otherwise lost during June 1822.

1 June

2 June

3 June

8 June

9 June

10 June

11 June

12 June

13 June

14 June

18 June

21 June

22 June

23 June

26 June

29 June

30 June

Unknown date

References

1822-06